The 2016–17 Brooklyn Nets season was the 41st season of the franchise in the National Basketball Association (NBA), 50th season overall, and its fifth season playing in the New York City borough of Brooklyn.

The season marked Brook Lopez's final one with the Nets, as he was traded to the Los Angeles Lakers in the off-season. He became the franchise's all-time leading scorer on April 10 when he broke Buck Williams' record that stood for 28 years.

The Nets hired Kenny Atkinson after Lionel Hollins was fired during the middle of the previous season. General manager Billy King was also fired. Sean Marks took over as the Nets began rebuilding. They finished 20–62, their worst record since 2009–10. In the month of February, the Nets went 0–10 marking the first time that they lost every game in a single month since going 0–14 in November 2009.

Key dates
April 17: The Nets hire Kenny Atkinson as their head coach.

Draft picks

Roster

Standings

Division

Conference

Game log

Pre-season

|- style="background:#bfb;"
| 1
| October 6
| Pistons
|  
| Jeremy Lin (21)
| Trevor Booker (5)
| Randy Foye (4)
| Barclays Center8,782
| 1–0
|- style="background:#fbb;"
| 2
| October 8
| @ Knicks
|  
| Anthony Bennett (15)
| Hamilton, McCullough (7)
| Yogi Ferrell (3)
| Madison Square Garden19,601
| 1–1
|- style="background:#fbb;"
| 3
| October 11
| @ Heat
| 
| Jeremy Lin (16)
| Trevor Booker (8)
| Greivis Vasquez (6)
| American Airlines Arena19,600
| 1–2
|- style="background:#fbb;"
| 4
| October 13
| Celtics
| 
| Luis Scola (14)
| Trevor Booker (12)
| Jeremy Lin (7)
| Barclays Center11,043
| 1–3
|- style="background:#fbb;"
| 5
| October 17
| @ Celtics
| 
| Sean Kilpatrick (15)
| Budinger, Lopez, McCullough (5)
| Jeremy Lin (5)
| TD Garden15,925
| 1–4
|- style="background:#fbb;"
| 6
| October 20
| Knicks
| 
| Jeremy Lin (24)
| Hamilton, Scola (6)
| Jeremy Lin (10)
| Barclays Center17,732
| 1–5

Regular season

|- style="background:#fcc"
| 1
| October 26
| @ Boston
| 
| Bojan Bogdanović (21)
| Justin Hamilton (10)
| Trevor Booker (5)
| TD Garden18,624
| 0–1
|- style="background:#cfc"
| 2
| October 28
| Indiana
| 
| Brook Lopez (25)
| Trevor Booker (11)
| Jeremy Lin (9)
| Barclays Center17,732
| 1–1
|- style="background:#fcc"
| 3
| October 29
| @ Milwaukee
| 
| Bojan Bogdanović (26)
| Trevor Booker (14)
| Jeremy Lin (10) 
| BMO Harris Bradley Center12,570
| 1–2
|- style="background:#fcc"
| 4
| October 31
| Chicago
| 
| Jeremy Lin (14)
| Trevor Booker (8)
| Jeremy Lin (4)
| Barclays Center15,842
| 1–3

|- style="background:#cfc"
| 5
| November 2
| Detroit
| 
| Brook Lopez (34)
| Brook Lopez (11)
| Rondae Hollis-Jefferson (6)
| Barclays Center13,650
| 2–3
|- style="background:#fcc"
| 6
| November 4
| Charlotte
| 
| Sean Kilpatrick (19)
| Trevor Booker (13)
| Rondae Hollis-Jefferson (6)
| Barclays Center15,775
| 2–4
|- style="background:#cfc"
| 7
| November 8
| Minnesota
| 
| Brook Lopez (26)
| Trevor Booker (9)
| Isaiah Whitehead (7)
| Barclays Center13,610
| 3–4
|- style="background:#fcc"
| 8
| November 9
| @ New York
| 
| Lopez, Hamilton (21)
| Joe Harris (7)
| Sean Kilpatrick (5)
| Madison Square Garden19,812
| 3–5
|- style="background:#cfc"
| 9
| November 12
| @ Phoenix
| 
| Rondae Hollis-Jefferson (20)
| Rondae Hollis-Jefferson (13)
| Hollis-Jefferson, Booker, Kilpatrick (4)
| Talking Stick Resort Arena17,126
| 4–5
|- style="background:#fcc"
| 10
| November 14
| @ L.A. Clippers
| 
| Bojan Bogdanović (18)
| Anthony Bennett (9)
| Yogi Ferrell (5)
| Staples Center19,060
| 4–6
|- style="background:#fcc"
| 11
| November 15
| @ L.A. Lakers
| 
| Brook Lopez (30)
| Lopez, Booker (26)
| Randy Foye (7)
| Staples Center18,624
| 4–7
|- style="background:#fcc"
| 12
| November 18
| @ Oklahoma City
| 
| Brook Lopez (22)
| Rondae Hollis-Jefferson (5)
| Isaiah Whitehead (4)
| Chesapeake Energy Arena18,203
| 4–8
|- style="background:#fcc"
| 13
| November 20
| Portland
| 
| Brook Lopez (21)
| Brook Lopez (6)
| Lopez, Hollis-Jefferson (4)
| Barclays Center16,608
| 4–9
|- style="background:#fcc"
| 14
| November 23
| Boston
| 
| Sean Kilpatrick (23)
| Trevor Booker (12)
| Booker, Whitehead, Kilpatrick (3)
| Barclays Center16,210
| 4–10
|- style="background:#fcc"
| 15
| November 25
| @ Indiana
| 
| Brook Lopez (20)
| Trevor Booker (10)
| Whitehead, Kilpatrick (7)
| Bankers Life Fieldhouse16,083
| 4–11
|- style="background:#fcc"
| 16
| November 27
| Sacramento
| 
| Sean Kilpatrick (22)
| Justin Hamilton (10)
| Trevor Booker (5)
| Barclays Center13,646
| 4–12
|- style="background:#cfc"
| 17
| November 29
| L.A. Clippers
| 
| Sean Kilpatrick (38)
| Sean Kilpatrick (14)
| Trevor Booker (5)
| Barclays Center15,681
| 5–12

|- style="background:#fcc"
| 18
| December 1
| Milwaukee
| 
| Brook Lopez (15)
| Trevor Booker (8)
| Whitehead, Kilpatrick (4)
| Barclays Center12,675
| 5–13
|- style="background:#fcc"
| 19
| December 3
| @ Milwaukee
| 
| Bojan Bogdanović (24)
| Anthony Bennett (14)
| Brook Lopez (6)
| BMO Harris Bradley Center15,565
| 5–14
|- style="background:#fcc"
| 20
| December 5
| Washington
| 
| Brook Lopez (25)
| Trevor Booker (14)
| Whitehead, Lopez (5)
| Barclays Center12,529
| 5–15
|- style="background:#cfc"
| 21
| December 7
| Denver
| 
| Brook Lopez (24)
| Trevor Booker (12)
| Trevor Booker (5)
| Barclays Center14,159
| 6–15
|- style="background:#fcc"
| 22
| December 10
| @ San Antonio
| 
| Bojan Bogdanović (20)
| Luis Scola (11)
| Brook Lopez (5)
| AT&T Center18,418
| 6–16
|- style="background:#fcc;"
| 23
| December 12
| @ Houston
|  
| Brook Lopez (26)
| Trevor Booker (13)
| Jeremy Lin (7)
| Toyota Center13,619
| 6–17
|- style="background:#cfc;"
| 24
| December 14
| L. A. Lakers
|  
| Bojan Bogdanović (23)
| Trevor Booker (18)
| Sean Kilpatrick (5)
| Barclays Center17,732
| 7–17
|- style="background:#fcc;"
| 25
| December 16
| @ Orlando
|  
| Brook Lopez (22)
| Trevor Booker (9)
| Isaiah Whitehead (8)
| Amway Center17,668
| 7–18
|-style="background:#fcc;"
| 26
| December 18
| @ Philadelphia
| 
| Brook Lopez (22)
| Brook Lopez (9)
| Brook Lopez (8)
| Wells Fargo Center 16,460
| 7–19
|- style="background:#fcc;"
| 27
| December 20
| @ Toronto
| 
| Hollis-Jefferson (19)
| Justin Hamilton (11)
| Hamilton, Hollis-Jefferson (4)
| Air Canada Centre19,800
| 7–20
|- style="background:#fcc;"
| 28
| December 22
| Golden State
| 
| Brook Lopez (28)
| Lopez, Lin (8)
| Jeremy Lin (11)
| Barclays Center17,732
| 7–21
|- style="background:#fcc;"
| 29
| December 23
| @ Cleveland
| 
| Brook Lopez (16)
| Caris LeVert (7)
| Jeremy Lin (6)
| Quicken Loans Arena 20,562
| 7–22
|- style="background:#cfc;"
| 30
| December 26
| Charlotte
| 
| Bojan Bogdanović (26)
| Trevor Booker (12)
| Brook Lopez (5)
| Barclays Center17,732
| 8–22
|- style="background:#fcc;"
| 31
| December 28
| @ Chicago
| 
| Brook Lopez (33)
| Trevor Booker (14)
| Sean Kilpatrick (6)
| United Center21,957
| 8–23
|- style="background:#fcc;"
| 32
| December 30
| @ Washington
| 
| Booker, Hollis-Jefferson (16)
| Trevor Booker (7)
| Brook Lopez (6)
| Verizon Center16,461
| 8–24

|- style="background:#fcc;"
| 33
| January 2
| Utah
| 
| Trevor Booker (17)
| Trevor Booker (15)
| Spencer Dinwiddie (4)
| Barclays Center15,634
| 8–25
|- style="background:#fcc;"
| 34
| January 5
| @ Indiana
| 
| Booker, Hamilton (16)
| Justin Hamilton (11)
| Sean Kilpatrick (5)
| Bankers Life Fieldhouse16,421
| 8–26
|- style="background:#fcc;"
| 35
| January 6
| Cleveland
| 
| Bojan Bogdanovic (23)
| Trevor Booker (12)
| Caris LeVert (5)
| Barclays Center17,732
| 8–27
|- style="background:#fcc;"
| 36
| January 8
| Philadelphia
| 
| Brook Lopez (26)
| Bojan Bogdanovic (8)
| Booker, Whitehead, Bogdanovic, Dinwiddie, Kilpatrick (3)
| Barclays Center16,123
| 8–28
|- style="background:#fcc;"
| 37
| January 10
| Atlanta
| 
| Brook Lopez (20)
| Hollis-Jefferson, Dinwiddie, Scola (7)
| Spencer Dinwiddie (5)
| Barclays Center13,279
| 8–29
|- style="background:#fcc;"
| 38
| January 12
| New Orleans
| 
| Bojan Bogdanovic (20)
| Trevor Booker (12)
| Hollis-Jefferson, Dinwiddie, Booker (4)
| Barclays Center14,352
| 8–30
|- style="background:#fcc;"
| 39
| January 13
| @ Toronto
| 
| Brook Lopez (20)
| Bojan Bogdanovic (7)
| Randy Foye (7)
| Air Canada Centre19,800
| 8–31
|- style="background:#fcc;"
| 40
| January 15
| Houston
| 
| Rondae Hollis-Jefferson (14)
| Rondae Hollis-Jefferson (7)
| Spencer Dinwiddie (8)
| Barclays Center17,732
| 8–32
|- style="background:#fcc;"
| 41
| January 17
| Toronto
| 
| Brook Lopez (28)
| Booker, Lopez, Hollis-Jefferson (8)
| Caris LeVert (4)
| Barclays Center12,874
| 8–33
|- style= "background:#cfc;"
| 42
| January 20
| @ New Orleans
| 
| Lopez, Bogdanovic (23)
| Brook Lopez (8)
| Caris LeVert (8)
| Smoothie King Center 17,004
| 9–33
|-style="background:#fcc;"
| 43
| January 21
| @ Charlotte
| 
| Brook Lopez (24)
| Trevor Booker (9)
| Kilpatrick, Foye (5)
| Spectrum Center18,583
| 9–34
|-style="background:#fcc;"
| 44
| January 23
| San Antonio
| 
| Isaiah Whitehead (19)
| Sean Kilpatrick (10)
| Randy Foye (4)
| Barclays Center16,643
| 9–35
|-style="background:#fcc;"
| 45
| January 25
| Miami
| 
| Brook Lopez (33)
| Trevor Booker (6)
| Dinwiddie, Foye, LeVert (4)
| Barclays Center14,929
| 9–36
|- style= "background:#fcc;"
| 46
| January 27
| @ Cleveland
| 
| Sean Kilpatrick (18)
| Randy Foye (8)
| Randy Foye (5)
| Quicken Loans Arena 20,562
| 9–37
|- style="background:#fcc;"
| 47
| January 28
| @ Minnesota
| 
| Brook Lopez (25)
| Lopez, Hamilton (7)
| Isaiah Whitehead (8)
| Target Center14,798
| 9–38
|- style="background:#fcc;"
| 48
| January 30
| @ Miami
| 
| Bojan Bogdanovic (16)
| Rondae Hollis-Jefferson (11)
| Isaiah Whitehead (5)
| American Airlines Arena19,600
| 9–39

|- style="background:#fcc;"
| 49
| February 1
| New York
| 
| Rondae Hollis-Jefferson (16)
| Hollis-Jefferson, Booker (8)
| Isaiah Whitehead (4)
| Barclays Center17,732
| 9–40
|- style="background:#fcc;"
| 50
| February 3
| Indiana
| 
| Brook Lopez (23)
| Trevor Booker (7)
| Kilpatrick, Booker, Whitehead (4)
| Barclays Center14,557
| 9–41
|- style="background:#fcc;"
| 51
| February 5
| Toronto
| 
| Brook Lopez (20)
| Trevor Booker (10)
| Randy Foye (5)
| Barclays Center14,245
| 9–42
|-style="background:#fcc;"
| 52
| February 7
| @ Charlotte
| 
| Bojan Bogdanovic (22)
| Trevor Booker (12)
| Isaiah Whitehead (7)
| Spectrum Center15,322
| 9–43
|- style="background:#fcc;"
| 53
| February 8
| Washington
| 
| Bojan Bogdanovic (21)
| Hollis-Jefferson, Booker (11)
| Lopez, Bogdanovic (4)
| Barclays Center13,179
| 9–44
|- style="background:#fcc;"
| 54
| February 10
| Miami
| 
| Brook Lopez (30)
| Trevor Booker (10)
| Spencer Dinwiddie (8)
| Barclays Center15,382
| 9–45
|- style="background:#fcc;"
| 55
| February 13
| Memphis
| 
| Dinwiddie, Lopez (17)
| Sean Kilpatrick (6)
| Brook Lopez (5)
| Barclays Center13,597
| 9–46
|- style="background:#fcc;"
| 56
| February 15
| Milwaukee
| 
| Brook Lopez (36)
| Rondae Hollis-Jefferson (10)
| Spencer Dinwiddie (8)
| Barclays Center16,182
| 9–47
|- style="background:#fcc;"
| 57
| February 24
| @ Denver
| 
| Brook Lopez (17)
| Trevor Booker (9)
| Lin, Dinwiddie (5)
| Pepsi Center17,143
| 9–48
|- style="background:#fcc;"
| 58
| February 25
| @ Golden State
| 
| Rondae Hollis-Jefferson (16)
| Hollis-Jefferson, Booker, Kilpatrick (10)
| Dinwiddie, Lopez (5)
| Oracle Arena19,596
| 9–49

|-style="background:#cfc;"
| 59
| March 1
| @ Sacramento
| 
| Brook Lopez (24)
| Booker, Lopez (5)
| Jeremy Lin (5)
| Golden 1 Center17,608
| 10–49
|- style="background:#fcc;"
| 60
| March 3
| @ Utah
| 
| Quincy Acy (18)
| Trevor Booker (11)
| Spencer Dinwiddie (3)
| Vivint Smart Home Arena19,911
| 10–50
|- style="background:#fcc;"
| 61
| March 4
| @ Portland
| 
| Brook Lopez (26)
| Rondae Hollis-Jefferson (8)
| Caris LeVert (6)
| Moda Center19,638
| 10–51
|- style="background:#cfc;"
| 62
| March 6
| @ Memphis
| 
| Sean Kilpatrick (23)
| Trevor Booker (9)
| Dinwiddie, Kilpatrick (3)
| FedExForum15,505
| 11–51
|- style="background:#fcc;"
| 63
| March 8
| @ Atlanta
| 
| Sean Kilpatrick (27)
| Trevor Booker (8)
| Jeremy Lin (8)
| Philips Arena11,931
| 11–52
|- style="background:#fcc;"
| 64
| March 10
| @ Dallas
| 
| Isaiah Whitehead (24)
| Trevor Booker (7)
| Sean Kilpatrick (5)
| American Airlines Center 20,022
| 11–53
|- style="background:#cfc;"
| 65
| March 12
| New York
| 
| Brook Lopez (26)
| Rondae Hollis-Jefferson (11)
| Spencer Dinwiddie (6)
| Barclays Center17,732
| 12–53
|-style="background:#fcc;"
| 66
| March 14
| Oklahoma City
| 
| Brook Lopez (25)
| Brook Lopez (6)
| Jeremy Lin (5)
| Barclays Center13,911
| 12–54
|-style="background:#cfc;"
| 67
| March 16
| @ New York
| 
| Brook Lopez (24)
| Rondae Hollis-Jefferson (10)
| Jeremy Lin (8)
| Madison Square Garden19,812
| 13–54
|-style="background:#fcc;"
| 68
| March 17
| Boston
| 
| Brook Lopez (23)
| Quincy Acy (8)
| Jeremy Lin (6)
| Barclays Center17,732
| 13–55
|-style="background:#fcc;"
| 69
| March 19
| Dallas
| 
| Brook Lopez (27)
| Rondae Hollis-Jefferson (9)
| Spencer Dinwiddie (7)
| Barclays Center14,045
| 13–56
|-style="background:#cfc;"
| 70
| March 21
| Detroit
| 
| Brook Lopez (29)
| Spencer Dinwiddie (8)
| Randy Foye (5)
| Barclays Center14,343
| 14–56
|-style="background:#cfc;"
| 71
| March 23
| Phoenix
| 
| Brook Lopez (19)
| Rondae Hollis-Jefferson (16)
| Jeremy Lin (5)
| Barclays Center15,141
| 15–56
|- style="background:#fcc;"
| 72
| March 24
| @ Washington
| 
| Justin Hamilton (20)
| Hollis-Jefferson, Lopez (7)
| Randy Foye (4)
| Verizon Center19,616
| 15–57
|- style="background:#cfc;"
| 73
| March 26
| @ Atlanta
| 
| Brook Lopez (23)
| Rondae Hollis-Jefferson (13)
| Jeremy Lin (7)
| Philips Arena15,921
| 16–57
|- style="background:#fcc;"
| 74
| March 28
| Philadelphia
| 
| Brook Lopez (26)
| Brook Lopez (9)
| Jeremy Lin (7)
| Barclays Center15,471
| 16–58
|- style="background:#fcc;"
| 75
| March 30
| @ Detroit
| 
| Sean Kilpatrick (15)
| Hollis-Jefferson, Lopez (9)
| LeVert, Lin (4)
| The Palace of Auburn Hills15,804
| 16–59

|- style="background:#cfc;"
| 76
| April 1
| Orlando
| 
| Brook Lopez (30)
| Trevor Booker (8)
| Jeremy Lin (8)
| Barclays Center15,976
| 17–59
|- style="background:#cfc;"
| 77
| April 2
| Atlanta
| 
| Brook Lopez (29)
| Sean Kilpatrick (11)
| Jeremy Lin (6)
| Barclays Center15,040
| 18–59
|- style="background:#cfc;"
| 78
| April 4
| @ Philadelphia
| 
| Lin, Lopez (16)
| Booker, Lin (5)
| Dinwiddie, LeVert, Lin (7)
| Wells Fargo Center14,580
| 19–59
|- style="background:#fcc;"
| 79
| April 6
| @ Orlando
| 
| Jeremy Lin (32)
| Acy, Goodwin, Hollis-Jefferson, Lin, Lopez (5)
| Rondae Hollis-Jefferson (4)
| Amway Center18,095
| 19–60
|- style="background:#cfc;"
| 80
| April 8
| Chicago
| 
| Dinwiddie, LeVert (19)
| Rondae Hollis-Jefferson (12)
| Jeremy Lin (7)
| Barclays Center17,732
| 20–60
|- style="background:#fcc;"
| 81
| April 10
| @ Boston
| 
| Jeremy Lin (26)
| Jeremy Lin (12)
| Lin, Whitehead (4)
| TD Garden18,624
| 20–61
|- style="background:#fcc;"
| 82
| April 12
| @ Chicago
| 
| Archie Goodwin (20)
| Justin Hamilton (7)
| Goodwin, Hamilton (4)
| United Center21,648
| 20–62

Transactions

Trades

Free agency

Additions

Subtractions

References

Brooklyn Nets season
Brooklyn Nets seasons
Brooklyn Nets
Brooklyn Nets
2010s in Brooklyn
Events in Brooklyn, New York
Prospect Heights, Brooklyn